The S&P Global 1200 Index is a free-float weighted stock market index of global equities from Standard & Poor's. The index was launched on Sep 30, 1999 and covers 31 countries and approximately 70 percent of global stock market capitalization. It is composed of seven regional indices: 

S&P 500 Index (United States) 
S&P Asia 50 Index (Hong Kong, Singapore, South Korea and Taiwan)
S&P/ASX 50 Index (Australia)
S&P Europe 350 Index (the European index is divided into three subindices: the S&P Euro, covering the eurozone markets; the S&P Euro Plus, adding Denmark, Norway, Sweden and Switzerland; and the S&P United Kingdom)
S&P Latin America 40 Index (Brazil, Chile, Colombia, Mexico and Peru)
S&P/TOPIX 150 Index (Japan)
S&P/TSX 60 Index (Canada)

The Global 1200 includes companies in all ten GICS sectors. The largest sector, in terms of weight and number of companies, is financials. Other top sectors represented are consumer discretionary, health care, and information technology. Among the smallest are utilities, materials, telecommunication services, and energy.

Subset
S&P also has the "S&P International 700", which is the S&P Global 1200 minus the S&P 500.

Top 10 Constituents by index weight

See also
 MSCI World
 S&P Global 100

References

External links
 Standard & Poors page for S&P Global 1200 Index

Global stock market indices
Global 1200